Romañach is a surname. Notable people with the surname include:

Leopoldo Romañach (1862–1951), Cuban painter
Mario Romañach (1917–1984), Cuban architect and professor
Tomás Romañach (1890–?), Cuban baseball player